Dhalbhum subdivision is an administrative subdivision of the East Singhbhum district in the Kolhan division in the state of Jharkhand, India.

History  
Dhalbhum subdivision was created in 1920 with Jamshedpur as headquarters.

Administrative set up 
The district consists of two subdivisions - (1) Dhalbhum subdivision with Patamda, Boram, Golmuri-cum-Jugsalai and Potka CD blocks, and (2) Ghatshila subdivision with Ghatshila, Dhalbhumgarh, Musabani, Dumaria, Gurbandha, Chakulia and Baharagora CD blocks.

The subdivisions of Purbi Singhbhum  district have the following distinctions:

 
Note: Calculated on the basis of block-wise data available.

Police stations 
Police stations in the Dhalbhum subdivision are at: 
 Bagbera 
 Birsanagar 
 Bistupur 
 Boram 
 Govindpur 
 Jugsalai 
 Kadma 
 Mango 
 Patamda 
 Potka 
 Parsudih 
 Sakchi 
 Azadnagar 
 Burmamines 
 Golmuri 
 Kamalpur 
 Olidih 
 Sidhagora 
 Sitaramdera 
 Sonari 
 Sundarnagar 
 Sspur 
Telco

Blocks 
Community development blocks in the Dhalbhum subdivision are:

Education  
In 2011, in Dhalbhum subdivision out of a total 523 inhabited villages in 4 CD blocks there were 38 villages with pre-primary schools, 479 villages with primary schools, 95 villages with middle schools, 40 villages with secondary schools, 5 villages with senior secondary schools, 44 villages with no educational facility.

The 3 statutory towns (Jamshedpur, Mango, Jugsalai) had 329 primary schools, 401 middle schools, 105 secondary schools, 16 senior secondary schools and 9 general degree colleges. 7 census towns had 84 primary schools, 38 middle schools, 23 secondary schools, 6 senior secondary schools, 1 general degree college. (Census towns are normally considered to be a part of the CD block but it is not clear where these are being considered here). 
.*Senior secondary schools are also known as Inter colleges in Jharkhand.

Educational institutions  
The following institutions are located in Dhalbhum subdivision:

National Metallurgical Laboratory, a premier research organization, was established at Jamshedpur in 1950. 
XLRI – Xavier School of Management, the oldest business school in the country, was established at Jamshedpur in 1949.  
Jamshedpur Women's College was established at Jamshedpur in 1953. 
Jamshedpur Co-operative College was established at Jamshedpur in 1954.
Jamshedpur Worker's College was established at Mango in 1957. 
Karim City College, Jamshedpur was established at Jamshedpur in 1961. 
The Graduate School College for Women, Jamshedpur was established at Jamshedpur in 1971. 
Lal Bahadur Shastri Memorial College was established at Jamshedpur in 1971.  
J. K. S. College, Jamshedpur was established at Jamshedpur in 1979. 
Patamda Degree College was established at Patamda in 1993.
Jamshedpur Cooperative Law College was established at Jamshedpur in 2003.  
Loyola College of Education was established at Jamshedpur in 1976.

(Information about degree colleges in the subdivision with proper reference may be added here)

Healthcare  
In 2011, in Dhalbhum subdivision, in the 4 CD blocks, there were 6 villages with primary health centres, 55 villages with primary health subcentres, 15 villages with maternity and child welfare centres, 4 villages with allopathic hospitals, 7 villages with dispensaries,  7 villages with family welfare centres, 20 villages with medicine shops.

The 3 statutory towns in the subdivision had 29 hospitals, 43 nursing homes, 148 health centres, 148 dispensaries, 15 maternity and child welfare centres, 17 family welfare centres, 1,123 medicine shops. 7 census towns had 31 hospitals, 34 nursing homes, 30 dispensaries, 66 maternity and child welfare centres, 33 medicine shops. (Census towns are normally considered to be a part of the CD block but it is not clear where these are being considered here).  
.*Private medical practitioners, alternative medicine etc. not included

Medical facilities  
 Tata Main Hospital, with 914 beds, was established at Jamshedpur in 1908.
 Mahatma Gandhi Memorial Medical College, Jamshedpur, was established at Jamshedpur in 1961. It has 540 beds.

(Anybody having referenced information about location of government/ private medical facilities may please add it here)

References  

  

Sub-divisions in Jharkhand